Bangladesh Film Archive is an independent institution that is the national film archive of Bangladesh and preserves films, commercials and other visual medias produced in Bangladesh. It is located in Shahbagh, Dhaka, Bangladesh.

History
The archive was established in 1978 by the government of Bangladesh. In 1984 it was made an independent institution. In 2016 the archive donated Pramathesh Barua's `Devdas' original print to India.

References

Government agencies of Bangladesh
1978 establishments in Bangladesh
Film archives in Asia
Organisations based in Dhaka
Ministry of Information and Broadcasting (Bangladesh)